Tataouine is a city in southern Tunisia. It is the capital of the Tataouine Governorate. The below-ground "cave dwellings" of the native Berber population, designed for coolness and protection, render the city and the area around it a tourist and film makers' attraction.

Etymology
The name  means 'eyes' and 'water springs' in the Berber language. It is sometimes transliterated in European languages as Tatahouine, Tatahouïne, Tatawin or Tatooine. The names "Tataouine", "Tatahouine" and "Foum Tatahouine" all appeared in the postcards portraying the city in the 1920s.

History 
From 1892 to 1951, Tataouine was the garrison town of the French penal military unit known as the "Battalion of Light Infantry of Africa". After the French established the town, a mosque (built in 1898) and homes were built in Tataouine.

On June 27, 1931, a meteorite of unusual achondrite type and green color impacted at Tataouine; about 12 kg of fragments were found. The meteorite consists largely of the mineral enstatite, and is of the rare Diogenite type.

Tataouine became the inspiration of Tatooine when the town was chosen as a filming location for exterior scenes of the desert planet in the Star Wars film series.

In March 2015, it was briefly reported that ISIL was using Tataouine as a military base, but later these claims were denied by the Tunisian government as false.

In September 2016, a new oil field was found south of the town by the Italian company Eni.

Climate

Culture
The Ksour Festival is an annual festival held in Tataouine in March. In Tataouine some people speak a Berber dialect.

Tataouine in scientific names

Meteorite Tatahouine 
On June 27, 1931, at 1:30am, a meteorite of a weight currently estimated of ca 50 kg fell 4 km North of town. Due to a transcription error, it is recorded in the Meteoretical Society international database under the name Tatahouine (with an added h). It is a rare diogenite originating from 4 Vesta in the asteroid belt.

Bacteria Ramlibacter tataouinensis 
On observing fragments of the Tatahouine meteorite, researchers noticed rod-like structures. Upon further investigation, those turned out to be a kind of bacteria which was named Ramlibacter tataouinensis (from Raml meaning sand in Arabic, bacter meaning bacteria in Latin, and the adjective referring to the town of Tatatouine) and which survive in the desert soil of the region despite harsh conditions. This bacteria and another closely related one which was named Ramlibacter henchirensis (from Henchir meaning in Tunisian dialect a field surrounded by stones or antique ruins) have the peculiar feature to be spherical during the day (forming a microbial cyst with a thick wall protecting them from desiccation, the extreme heat and the sun's UV) and become rod-like during the night when they need less protection, thus becoming able to move and colonize even the smallest cracks in rocks. The discovery and research around Ramlibacter tataouinensis is scientifically significant because it demonstrated that rod-like structures observed in another meteorite, the ALH 84001 discovered in Antartica, and thought for a time to be of extraterrestrial origin, could actually be terrestrial bacteria from the ground which had contaminated and then colonized the sample.

Dinosaur Tataouinea Hannibalensis 
Numerous fossils, from vegetal, trees, to animals as well as dinosaurs footprints have been found in the region, several being exhibited at Museum of Earth Memory in town. Among dinosaurs, Tataouinea is a genus of dinosaurs whose only currently known representative is a lizard-footed (sauropod) with avian-like bone structures discovered in 2013 and 2015 named Tataouinea Hannibalensis in honor of the Carthaginian general Hannibal Barca.

Popular culture 
Star Wars: Tataouine's name became famous worldwide when George Lucas, who shot the original Star Wars film in various locations in Tunisia, named Luke Skywalker's fictional home planet Tatooine.
X-Files: Tataouine appeared in the end of the film The X-Files as Foum Tataouine, where an extraterrestrial viral experiment facility was located.
The Amazing Race: Tataouine appeared in the fifth episode of The Amazing Race 1.

Gallery

References

Notes

External links

Populated places in Tataouine Governorate
Communes of Tunisia